Andrew Crummey (born October 22, 1984) is a former American football guard. He was signed by the Washington Redskins as an undrafted free agent in 2008. He played college football at Maryland.

Crummey was also a member of the Cincinnati Bengals, Houston Texans, Jacksonville Jaguars, Carolina Panthers, and Las Vegas Locomotives.

Early years
Crummey graduated from Van Wert High School where he helped his team to a state championship game in 2000.

References

External links
Just Sports Stats
Carolina Panthers bio
Cincinnati Bengals bio
Houston Texans bio
Maryland Terrapins bio

1984 births
Living people
People from Van Wert, Ohio
Players of American football from Ohio
American football offensive guards
American football centers
Maryland Terrapins football players
Washington Redskins players
Cincinnati Bengals players
Houston Texans players
Jacksonville Jaguars players
Las Vegas Locomotives players